Phocanella is an extinct genus of earless seals from the early Pliocene of Belgium and the US Eastern Seaboard.

The type and only species of Phocanella is P. pumila. The second nominal Phocanella species, P. minor, is a synonym. Two additional taxa referred to the genus, P. couffoni and P. straeleni, are nomina dubia.

References

Pliocene pinnipeds
Phocines
Prehistoric carnivoran genera
Prehistoric pinnipeds of Europe
Fossil taxa described in 1877